is a railway station in Suruga-ku, Shizuoka, Shizuoka Prefecture, Japan, operated by the private railway company, Shizuoka Railway (Shizutetsu).

Lines
Mikadodai Station is a station on the Shizuoka–Shimizu Line and is 7.4 kilometers from the starting point of the line at Shin-Shizuoka Station.

Station layout
The station has a single island platform. The station building is built on the south end of the platform, and has automated ticket machines, and automated turnstiles, which accept the LuLuCa smart card ticketing system as well as the PiTaPa and ICOCA IC cards. The station is wheelchair accessible.

Platforms

Adjacent stations

Station History
It was renamed to its present name on March 1, 1961.

Passenger statistics
In fiscal 2017, the station was used by an average of 1421 passengers daily (boarding passengers only).

Surrounding area
Udo Elementary School

See also
 List of railway stations in Japan

References

External links

 Shizuoka Railway official website

}

Railway stations in Shizuoka Prefecture
Railway stations in Japan opened in 1908
Railway stations in Shizuoka (city)